DiCosmo or Di Cosmo is an Italian surname. Notable people with the surname include:

Anthony DiCosmo (born 1977), American football player
Francesco DiCosmo, American rock musician
Julián Di Cosmo (born 1984), Argentine footballer
Nicola Di Cosmo, American historian and sinologist
Roberto Di Cosmo, Italian computer scientist

Italian-language surnames